Jincheon Station is a station of the Daegu Subway Line 1 in Jincheon-dong, Dalseo District, Daegu, South Korea. Jincheon Station is in Jincheon crossroads between Wolbaero and Jincheonno. Jincheon Station was a train terminal from November 26, 1997, to May 10, 2002, when Daegok Station was opened. The station has nothing to do with Jincheon-gun Chungcheongbukdo; the place of the station is Jincheon-dong.

The area around the station is composed of residential areas. To the north of the station, there used to be an old Wolbae Industrial Complex, but it is being developed sequentially as a residential district. Nearby are E-Mart Wolbae Branch, Wolbae Market, and bogang Hospital.

A safety gate was installed in February 2017.

Station layout

References

External links 
 DTRO virtual station

Daegu Metro stations
Dalseo District
Railway stations opened in 1997

음성 우미린 풀하우스